Coldwave Breaks is a various artists compilation album released on October 17, 1995 by 21st Circuitry.

Reception
Aiding & Abetting gave Coldwave Breaks a positive review and called it "a collection of club-ready stuff that has enough guitars and general noise to satisfy the staunchest loud music aficionado." Tom Schulte of allmusic awarded the compilation three out of five stars and described it as "fun and a real history lesson to listen to."

Track listing

Personnel
Adapted from the Coldwave Breaks liner notes.

 Don Blanchard – cover art
 Nathan Moody – cover art, illustrations
 Guy Slater – mastering

Release history

References

External links 
 Coldwave Breaks at Discogs (list of releases)

1995 compilation albums
Industrial rock compilation albums
21st Circuitry compilation albums